Carlindi Station (also sometimes spelled as Carlindie Station) is a pastoral lease that was once a sheep station but now operates as a cattle station in Western Australia. 

The lease shares a boundary with Shaw Station.

The property was established at some time prior to 1907 and was regarded as one of the smaller leases in the area. It was producing wool for export in 1908, and was stocked with a flock of 5,300 sheep in 1912.

In 1913 the lease was held by Archie McGregor and Percy Charles Riches. The flock was 10,000 sheep but it was estimated that the area could support 17,000. The owners were also breeding donkeys and mules which they thought would be useful for general station work and well repairing work.

McGregor collapsed and died suddenly in 1919, followed by Riches four months later. Thomas Molloy later became the station manager and remained for many years before moving to De Grey Station.

Currently Carlindi is part of the Strelley group, at the centre of a group of stations leased by the Nomads Charitable Foundation for the Aboriginal people of the area.

See also
List of ranches and stations
List of pastoral leases in Western Australia

References

Pastoral leases in Western Australia
Stations (Australian agriculture)
Homesteads in Western Australia
Pilbara